Bun & Bunee is a South African CG animated series created by Luma Animation. The First broadcast on SABC 3, 5 December 2009, being "showcased" until 10 May 2011. Historically distributed by Bejuba, the series has been licensed to several broadcasters in various countries.

Plot
Bun & Bunee follows the antics of two unusual Bunee brothers, who, together with their numerous, quirky friends, go on several comical adventures, frequently getting themselves in and out of trouble.

Main characters
 Bun
 Bunee
 Boogie
 Buneeluv
 Pig Boi
 Monkee
 Sheep
 Helmut Bois
 Chubby Nuts
 Biggest Butt Bear
 Hamstring
 Moosis

Episode list

2000s South African television series
2009 South African television series debuts
2011 South African television series endings
South African animated television series
Animated television series about rabbits and hares
Animated television series about brothers
Animated television series about twins
Animated television series without speech